Morozovitsa is a rural locality (a village) in and the administrative center of Tregubovskoye Rural Settlement, Velikoustyugsky District, Vologda Oblast, Russia. The population was 879 as of 2002. There are 20 streets.

Geography 
Morozovitsa is located 13 km south of Veliky Ustyug (the district's administrative centre) by road. Pestovo is the nearest rural locality.

References 

Rural localities in Velikoustyugsky District